Motherhood is a 2022 teen drama film written and directed by Pilar Palomero starring Carla Quílez and Ángela Cervantes.

Plot 
The plot tracks Carla, a 14-year old pregnant girl placed in a centre for teenage mothers where she hangs out with other teen classmates (Raki, Estel, Claudia, Jamila and Sheila). She also has to deal with the vicissitudes of her fraught relation with her mother Penélope.

Cast

Production 
The screenplay was penned by Pilar Palomero. Julián Elizalde worked as cinematographer.

Shooting took place in late 2021 and lasted for 8 weeks. Shooting locations included Los Monegros and Barcelona and its surroundings.

Release 
The film made its world premiere at the 70th San Sebastián International Film Festival's official selection on 20 September 2022. It will have its international premiere at the Zurich Film Festival. Distributed by BTeam Pictures, it is set for an 18 November 2022 theatrical release in Spain. Elle Driver acquired rights for worldwide sales outside Spain and France.

Reception 

According to the review aggregation website Rotten Tomatoes, the film has an 89% approval rating based on 9 reviews from critics, with an average rating of 8.0/10.

Jonathan Holland of ScreenDaily deemed the film to be "superbly directed by Palomero, who seems to have a special gift for seeing the world through children's eyes".

Raquel Hernández Luján of HobbyConsolas rated the film with 65 points ("acceptable") deeming it to be more interesting by its subject than by its forms, praising "the reality that [the film] makes visible" but pointing out that "the style is too crude, it is an unbearable film at times".

Juan Pando of Fotogramas rated the film 5 out of 5 stars, deeming it to be "one of the best films, if not the best, [in 2022 Spanish cinema]", praising "that true prodigy named Carla Quílez" as the best thing about the film while citing the film's excess length as a negative point.

Sergi Sánchez of La Razón rated the film 3 out of 5 stars, positively highlighting Quílez's naturalness while pointing out that "a certain capacity for synthesis is lacking" in the film.

Top ten lists 
The film appeared on a number of critics' top ten lists of the best Spanish films of 2022:

Accolades 

|-
| align = "center" | 2022 || 70th San Sebastián International Film Festival || Silver Shell for Best Leading Performance || Carla Quílez ||  || 
|-
| rowspan = "15" align = "center" | 2023
| rowspan = "5" | 15th Gaudí Awards || colspan = "2" | Best Non-Catalan Language Film ||  || rowspan = "5" | 
|-
| Best Director || Pilar Palomero || 
|-
| Best Original Screenplay || Pilar Palomero || 
|-
| Best Supporting Actress || Ángela Cervantes || 
|-
| Best New Performance || Carla Quílez || 
|-
| rowspan = "3" | 10th Feroz Awards || Best Director || Pilar Palomero ||  || rowspan = "3" | 
|-
| Best Actress in a Film || Carla Quílez || 
|-
| Best Supporting Actress in a Film || Ángela Cervantes || 
|-
| 2nd Carmen Awards || colspan = "2" | Best Non-Andalusian Film ||  || 
|-
| rowspan = "2" | 78th CEC Medals || Best Director || Pilar Palomero ||  || rowspan = "2" align = "center" | 
|-
| Best New Actress || Carla Quílez || 
|-
| rowspan = "3" | 37th Goya Awards || colspan = "2" | Best Film ||  || rowspan = "3" | 
|-
| Best Director || Pilar Palomero || 
|-
| Best Supporting Actress || Ángela Cervantes ||  
|-
| 31st Actors and Actresses Union Awards || Best Film Actress in a Secondary Role || Ángela Cervantes ||  || 
|}

See also 
 List of Spanish films of 2022

References 

Spanish drama films
Teenage pregnancy in film
Spanish pregnancy films
Films shot in Aragon
Films shot in Catalonia
2022 drama films
2022 films
Films about mother–daughter relationships
2020s Spanish-language films
2020s Spanish films